Exilisia bijuga is a moth of the subfamily Arctiinae. It was described by Paul Mabille in 1899. It is found on Madagascar.

Subspecies
Exilisia bijuga bijuga
Exilisia bijuga diegoi (Toulgoët, 1956)

References

 

Lithosiini
Moths described in 1899